The 2019 Changsha Open was a professional tennis tournament played on outdoor clay courts. It was the first edition of the tournament which was part of the 2019 ITF Women's World Tennis Tour. It took place in Changsha, China between 2 and 8 September 2019.

Singles main-draw entrants

Seeds

 1 Rankings are as of 26 August 2019.

Other entrants
The following players received wildcards into the singles main draw:
  Cao Siqi
  Liu Siqi
  Zhang Ying
  Zhao Qianqian

The following player received entry using a protected ranking:
  Gao Xinyu

The following players received entry from the qualifying draw:
  Angelina Gabueva
  Guo Meiqi
  Oleksandra Oliynykova
  Jessy Rompies
  Sun Xuliu
  Yuan Chengyiyi
  Zheng Wushuang
  Amy Zhu

Champions

Singles

 Nina Stojanović def.  Aleksandrina Naydenova, 6–1, 6–1

Doubles

 Jiang Xinyu /  Tang Qianhui def.  Rutuja Bhosale /  Erika Sema, 6–3, 3–6, [11–9]

References

External links
 2019 Changsha Open at ITFtennis.com

2019 ITF Women's World Tennis Tour
2019 in Chinese tennis
September 2019 sports events in China